The Virginia Department of Elections is an agency that administers elections in Virginia. Its duties include maintaining a voter registration system.

The Department is led by a five-member body, the State Board of Elections. State law provides, "The State Board, through the Department of Elections, shall supervise and coordinate the work of the county and city electoral boards and of the registrars to obtain uniformity in their practices and proceedings and legality and purity in all elections." The Department's current commissioner is Susan Beals.

References

External link
Official site

Virginia elections
Election commissions in the United States